Bolma rugosa is a species of large sea snail with a calcareous operculum, a marine gastropod mollusc in the family Turbinidae, the turban snails.

Description
The size of the shell varies between 25 mm and 70 mm. The solid, imperforate shell has a conic shape. It is brown or cinereous. The suture is canaliculate, bordered below by a series of curved radiating tubercles. The 6-7 whorls are obliquely lamellose striate. The upper ones are carinate and tuberculate or spinose at the periphery. The body whorl descends rounded or bicarinate and is spirally lirate. The base of the shell is conspicuously radiately striate. The aperture is obliquely, transversely oval, and pearly within. The columella is arched, white and pearly, with an orange callus dilated over the umbilical region and extending over the parietal wall.  The operculum is short-oval, brown within, with four whorls, the nucleus situated one-third the distance across the face. Outsideit is bright orange, polished, with a spiral callous ridge.

Distribution
This species occurs in the Atlantic Ocean off Portugal, Western Sahara, the Canary Islands,  Cape Verdes,  Madeira, the Azores; in the Mediterranean Sea (off Greece and the north of Catalonia)

References

 Brocchi G. B., 1814: Conchiologia fossile subappenninica con osservazioni geologiche sugli Appennini e sul suolo adiacente; Milano Vol. I: pp. LXXX + 56 + 240. Vol. II: pp. 241–712. Con 16 tavol
 Nordsieck F., 1982: Die europäischen Meeres-Gehäuseschnecken. 2. Auflage; Gustav Fischer, Stuttgart 539 pp., 38 pl
 Gofas, S.; Le Renard, J.; Bouchet, P. (2001). Mollusca, in: Costello, M.J. et al. (Ed.) (2001). European register of marine species: a check-list of the marine species in Europe and a bibliography of guides to their identification. Collection Patrimoines Naturels, 50: pp. 180–213

External links 

 http://www.gbif.net/species/16063478
 http://www.marbef.org/data/aphia.php?p=taxdetails&id=141855
 

rugosa
Gastropods described in 1767
Taxa named by Carl Linnaeus
Molluscs of the Atlantic Ocean
Molluscs of the Mediterranean Sea
Molluscs of the Azores
Molluscs of the Canary Islands
Molluscs of Madeira
Gastropods of Cape Verde
Molluscs of Europe
Fauna of Western Sahara